Disabled skiing was an Olympic demonstration sport for the first time at the 1984 Winter Olympics. There was alpine giant slalom held for men only, with medals awarded in four different standing disability classes. As a demonstration sport, these medals did not contribute to the overall medal count. These races were held in addition to the alpine and cross-country events at the 1984 Winter Paralympics in Innsbruck. Disabled skiing would be demonstrated at the Olympics again in 1988. A total of 29 disabled skiers from 11 nations participated in the 1984 Games.

Medal table

Men's giant slalom for single-leg amputees

Men's giant slalom for above-knee amputees

Men's giant slalom for single-arm amputees

Men's giant slalom for double-arm amputees

References 
 

1984 Winter Olympics events
Olympic demonstration sports
Men's events at the 1984 Winter Olympics